Pauline Pousse (born 17 September 1987) is a French athlete specialising in the discus throw. She won the bronze medal at the 2013 Jeux de la Francophonie.

Her personal best in the event is 62.68 metres set in Angers in 2016.

Five times Vice Champion of  France from 2010 to 2015 (excepting 2011), Pauline Pousse improved in 2016 where she advanced her personal best almost 3 metres, throwing 62.68m in the 2016 French national championships where she qualified for the 2016 Rio Olympics and for the European Championships at Amsterdam.

On 10 July 2016, she placed 8th at the  European Championships at Amsterdam with a throw of 59.62m.

International competitions

References

1987 births
Living people
French female discus throwers
People from Longjumeau
Athletes (track and field) at the 2016 Summer Olympics
Olympic athletes of France
Sportspeople from Essonne
Athletes (track and field) at the 2013 Mediterranean Games
Mediterranean Games competitors for France
21st-century French women